Chen Zhimin (born October 1955) is a Chinese politician.

Biography
Chen was born in Zhuji, Zhejiang in October 1955. He graduated from Chinese Academy of Sciences, where he majored in management science and engineering.

During  the Cultural Revolution was launched by Mao Zedong, Chen became involved in politics in 1969. In December 1985, Chen joined the Chinese Communist Party.

In March 2005, he was promoted to become the Assistant of Minister of Public Security, a position he held until 2009. He was promoted to become the Deputy Minister of Public Security in August 2009. In January 2018, he became a member of the 13th National Committee of the Chinese People's Political Consultative Conference.

References

1955 births
Living people
People from Zhuji
Hunan Normal University alumni
Chinese police officers
Chinese Communist Party politicians from Zhejiang
People's Republic of China politicians from Zhejiang
Politicians from Shaoxing
Members of the 13th Chinese People's Political Consultative Conference